Clapperton is a surname, and may refer to:

Hugh Clapperton (1788–1827), Scottish traveller and explorer of West and Central Africa
James Clapperton (b. 1968), a Scottish composer and pianist
Thomas J Clapperton (1879–1962), Scottish sculptor
William Henry Clapperton (1839–1922), a Canadian politician